Colossopus grandidieri is a nocturnal bush cricket endemic to southwestern Madagascar. C. grandidieri appears to be omnivorous and is the only member of its genus that has been bred successfully in captivity, with a diet including leaves, fruit, living and dead insects, and processed food including dog food and fish flakes.

Description
The pale brown, cigar-shaped eggs are deposited singly in soil, measuring only 6 mm when laid and swelling in size as they develop over three months to a year. Females lay 150 to 200 eggs in a lifetime. Adult females and males have similar coloration, except that the labrum ("upper lip") is orange-red in females and yellow-orange in males. When confronted, adults rear up on their hind legs, spread their forelegs, and open their mandibles in a defensive posture. Adult males make a shrill noise when in this position, and adult females do not make a sound. If the disturbing organism approaches, C. grandidieri attempts to grab it with the forelegs and bite it with the jaws.

References

Conocephalinae
Insects of Madagascar
Insects described in 1899
Taxa named by Henri Louis Frédéric de Saussure